Dimpy Bhalotia (born 1987) is an Indian street photographer based out of London and Mumbai. Bhalotia was Grand Prize Winner in the Photographer of the Year category at the iPhone Photography Awards in 2020 for her photograph "Flying Boys" photographed in Banaras, India. She was also one of the winners of the British Journal of Photography's Female in Focus Award in 2020.

Life and work 
Bhalotia was born and grew up in Mumbai, India. After her schooling she moved to London and graduated in BA (Hons) Fashion Design Technology: Womenswear from London College of Fashion, University of the Arts London.

The 2021 paperback edition of the novel Djinn Patrol on the Purple Line by Deepa Anappara used photographs by Bhalotia in the cover design.

Awards 
 2019: Italian Street Photo Festival
 2019: The Independent Photographer
 2019: 2nd place, series, iPhone Photography Awards
 2019: Grand Winner, Photobox Instagram Photography Awards (PIPA)
 2020: Fotografia Alicante Monovisions Award
 2020: 2nd Place, Oneshot: Movement, International Photography Awards (IPA)
 2020: 2nd Place, People, International Photography Awards (IPA)
 2020: Grand Prize Winner, Photographer of the Year category, iPhone Photography Awards (IPPAWARDS)
 2020: Budapest Foto Awards
 2020: Gold in Special/Smartphone Photography; second place in Special, The Prix de la Photographie
 2020: VI Concurso Internactional de Fotografía Alicante
 2020: 1 of 20 Single Image category winners, Female in Focus Award, British Journal of Photography
 2021: The Spider Awards
 2022: 3rd place, Lifestyle category, iPhone Photography Awards (IPPAWARDS)

Publications with contributions by Bhalotia 
#ICPConcerned: Global Images for Global Crisis. Glitterati. By David Campany. . Published in conjunction with an exhibition at the International Center of Photography in New York, 2020. Bhalotia contributed a photograph.

Group exhibitions and during festivals 
 Brussels Street Photography Festival, Brussels, Belgium, 2019
 PhoS Sofia Street Photography Days, Bulgaria, 2019
 El Barrio Art Space PS109, New York, USA, 2019
 Treviso Photographic Festival, Treviso, Italy, 2020
 The State Historical Museum of the Southern Urals, Chelyabinsk, Russia, 2020
 CLB Berlin Gallery for The Independent Photographer
 Posters on the Streets, New York 6 locations, USA, 2020
 Fédération Internationale de l’Art Photographique, Turkey, 2020
 International Centre of Photography, USA, 2020
 Paris Espace Beaurepaire, Paris, France, 2021

References

External links 
 

1987 births
Living people
Street photographers
Indian women photographers
21st-century women photographers
Photographers from Maharashtra